White Bear (Carlyle) Lake
is a closed-basin lake in the Moose Mountain Upland. It is the largest lake on the plateau, slightly larger than its neighbour, Kenosee Lake. White Bear (Carlyle) Lake is within the White Bear 70 Indian reserve and Carlyle Lake Resort is along the southern shore. The lake and its amenities can be accessed from Highway 9.

Originally the lake was named Carlyle Lake by the first European settlers to the area. In the late 1970s control of the lake was handed over to the White Bear First Nations and at that time the lake was renamed to White Bear (Carlyle) Lake.

Water levels
Beaver are not native to Moose Mountain and in 1923, two breeding pairs from Hudson Bay, Saskatchewan were brought to nearby Kenosee Lake. The beavers flourished and soon dams were blocking not just inflow creeks to Kenosee, but White Bear (Carlyle) Lake as well. According to aerial photographs, the surface of White Bear (Carlyle) Lake in 1928 was 737 metres asl. By 1945, it had dropped to 732 m. In 1954, four beaver dams in area were destroyed, which helped raise lake levels. By the late 1950s, the lake recovered to 735 m. Without continued intervention regarding dams, the lake level began to fall again and by 2008, it had dropped to 728 metres.

In 2008, the Moose Mountain Water Resource Management Corp. partnered with Moose Mountain Provincial Park to control beavers in and around the park through trapping and by blasting beaver dams. Once again, lake levels began to rise. The eventual goal is to raise Kenosee Lake levels enough so that it flows into White Bear (Carlyle) Lake, which hasn't happened since 1928.

Fish species
The most common fish in the lake is walleye.

See also
List of lakes of Saskatchewan

References

Lakes of Saskatchewan